The Buildings at Risk Register for Scotland records buildings of national architectural or historic interest which are considered to be under threat. The list is maintained by Historic Environment Scotland (HES). The register was established in 1990, with the purpose of raising awareness of the threats to Scotland's built heritage. It was maintained by the Scottish Civic Trust until 2011, then by RCAHMS until that body became part of HES in 2015.

The register comprises mainly listed buildings, that is buildings of "special architectural or historic interest", but may also include unlisted buildings which are within conservation areas. Other heritage assets, such as scheduled monuments, are not considered for inclusion on the register. Buildings are considered to be 'at risk' if they are under threat from demolition or neglect. The following criteria are among those used when considering buildings for inclusion:
 "vacant with no identified new use
 suffering from neglect and/or poor maintenance
 suffering from structural problems
 fire damaged
 unsecured and open to the elements
 threatened with demolition" 

The register is continuously updated: newly identified 'at risk' buildings being added; while other are removed either due to restoration or demolition. The Buildings at Risk Register website maintains a list of 'success stories', showcasing examples of buildings which have been restored or brought back into use. In 2013, 8% of Scotland's category A listed buildings, i.e. those of national importance, were on the Buildings at Risk Register, down from 8.7% in 2009. For each building on the register descriptive information is provided, and an assessment given of the condition of the building (from 'good' to 'ruinous') and the 'category of risk' (from 'minimal' to 'critical'). The register summarises the 'development history' of each building, detailing the progress of any restoration or other proposals.

See also
Heritage at Risk Register, the equivalent list in England

References

External links
Buildings at Risk Register for Scotland

 
 
Historic Environment Scotland
Heritage registers in Scotland
1990 establishments in Scotland